In four-dimensional euclidean geometry, the tesseractic honeycomb is one of the three regular space-filling tessellations (or honeycombs), represented by Schläfli symbol {4,3,3,4}, and constructed by a 4-dimensional packing of tesseract facets.

Its vertex figure is a 16-cell. Two tesseracts meet at each cubic cell, four meet at each square face, eight meet on each edge, and sixteen meet at each vertex.

It is an analog of the square tiling, {4,4}, of the plane and the cubic honeycomb, {4,3,4}, of 3-space. These are all part of the hypercubic honeycomb family of tessellations of the form {4,3,...,3,4}. Tessellations in this family are Self-dual.

Coordinates 
Vertices of this honeycomb can be positioned in 4-space in all integer coordinates (i,j,k,l).

Sphere packing 
Like all regular hypercubic honeycombs, the tesseractic honeycomb corresponds to a sphere packing of edge-length-diameter spheres centered on each vertex, or (dually) inscribed in each cell instead. In the hypercubic honeycomb of 4 dimensions, vertex-centered 3-spheres and cell-inscribed 3-spheres will both fit at once, forming the unique regular body-centered cubic lattice of equal-sized spheres (in any number of dimensions). Since the tesseract is radially equilateral, there is exactly enough space in the hole between the 16 vertex-centered 3-spheres for another edge-length-diameter 3-sphere. (This 4-dimensional body centered cubic lattice is actually the union of two tesseractic honeycombs, in dual positions.)

This is the same densest known regular 3-sphere packing, with kissing number 24, that is also seen in the other two regular tessellations of 4-space, the 16-cell honeycomb and the 24-cell-honeycomb. Each tesseract-inscribed 3-sphere kisses a surrounding shell of 24 3-spheres, 16 at the vertices of the tesseract and 8 inscribed in the adjacent tesseracts. These 24 kissing points are the vertices of a 24-cell of radius (and edge length) 1/2.

Constructions 
There are many different Wythoff constructions of this honeycomb. The most symmetric form is regular, with Schläfli symbol {4,3,3,4}. Another form has two alternating tesseract facets (like a checkerboard) with Schläfli symbol {4,3,31,1}. The lowest symmetry Wythoff construction has 16 types of facets around each vertex and a prismatic product Schläfli symbol {∞}4. One can be made by stericating another.

Related polytopes and tessellations 

The 24-cell honeycomb is similar, but in addition to the vertices at integers (i,j,k,l), it has vertices at half integers (i+1/2,j+1/2,k+1/2,l+1/2) of odd integers only. It is a half-filled body centered cubic (a checkerboard in which the red 4-cubes have a central vertex but the black 4-cubes do not).

The tesseract can make a regular tessellation of the 4-sphere, with three tesseracts per face, with Schläfli symbol {4,3,3,3}, called an order-3 tesseractic honeycomb. It is topologically equivalent to the regular polytope penteract in 5-space.

The tesseract can make a regular tessellation of 4-dimensional hyperbolic space, with 5 tesseracts around each face, with Schläfli symbol {4,3,3,5}, called an order-5 tesseractic honeycomb.

Birectified tesseractic honeycomb 
A birectified tesseractic honeycomb, contains all rectified 16-cell (24-cell) facets and is the Voronoi tessellation of the D4* lattice.

See also 
Regular and uniform honeycombs in 4-space:
16-cell honeycomb
24-cell honeycomb
5-cell honeycomb
Truncated 5-cell honeycomb
Omnitruncated 5-cell honeycomb

References 
 Coxeter, H.S.M. Regular Polytopes, (3rd edition, 1973), Dover edition,  p. 296, Table II: Regular honeycombs
 Kaleidoscopes: Selected Writings of H.S.M. Coxeter, edited by F. Arthur Sherk, Peter McMullen, Anthony C. Thompson, Asia Ivic Weiss, Wiley-Interscience Publication, 1995,  
 (Paper 24) H.S.M. Coxeter, Regular and Semi-Regular Polytopes III, [Math. Zeit. 200 (1988) 3-45]
 George Olshevsky, Uniform Panoploid Tetracombs, Manuscript (2006) (Complete list of 11 convex uniform tilings, 28 convex uniform honeycombs, and 143 convex uniform tetracombs) - Model 1
  x∞o x∞o x∞o x∞o, x∞x x∞o x∞o x∞o, x∞x x∞x x∞o x∞o, x∞x x∞x x∞x x∞o,x∞x x∞x x∞x x∞x, x∞o x∞o x4o4o, x∞o x∞o o4x4o, x∞x x∞o x4o4o, x∞x x∞o o4x4o, x∞o x∞o x4o4x, x∞x x∞x x4o4o, x∞x x∞x o4x4o, x∞x x∞o x4o4x, x∞x x∞x x4o4x, x4o4x x4o4x, x4o4x o4x4o, x4o4x x4o4o, o4x4o o4x4o, x4o4o o4x4o, x4o4o x4o4o, x∞x o3o3o *d4x, x∞o o3o3o *d4x, x∞x x4o3o4x, x∞o x4o3o4x, x∞x x4o3o4o, x∞o x4o3o4o, o3o3o *b3o4x, x4o3o3o4x, x4o3o3o4o - test - O1

Honeycombs (geometry)
5-polytopes
Regular tessellations